

Ernst Wellmann (14 January 1904 – 17 July 1970) was an officer in the Wehrmacht of Nazi Germany during World War II. He was a recipient of the Knight's Cross of the Iron Cross with Oak Leaves.

Awards and decorations

 Iron Cross (1939)  2nd Class (20 September 1939) & 1st Class (21 October 1939)
 German Cross in Gold on 8 June 1942 as Major in the I./Schützen-Regiment 3
 Knight's Cross of the Iron Cross with Oak Leaves
 Knight's Cross on 2 September 1942 as Oberstleutnant and commander of I./Panzergrenadier-Regiment 3
 342nd Oak Leaves on 30 November 1943 as Oberstleutnant and commander of Panzergrenadier-Regiment 3

References

Citations

Bibliography

 
 
 

1904 births
1970 deaths
People from Szamotuły
Recipients of the Gold German Cross
Recipients of the Knight's Cross of the Iron Cross with Oak Leaves
People from West Prussia
Reichswehr personnel
Brigadier generals of the German Army
German Army officers of World War II